Mikhail Ivanovich Eremets (born January 3, 1949) is an experimentalist in high pressure physics, chemistry and materials science. He is particularly known for his research on superconductivity, having discovered the highest critical temperature of 250 K (-23 °C) for superconductivity in lanthanum hydride under high pressures. Part of his research contains exotic manifestations of materials such as conductive hydrogen, polymeric nitrogen and transparent sodium.

Education and early life
Eremets was born in the Pinsk region. He studied physics at the Moscow Engineering Physics Institute (National Research Nuclear University MEPhI). In 1978 he received his PhD at the Moscow Institute of General Physics of the Academy of Sciences of the USSR.

Research and career
Eremets went on to work as a researcher in the High Pressure Physics Institute of the Academy of Sciences in Troitsk (Moscow region), eventually rising to the position of director of the High-Pressure Physics Department.  After 1991, Eremets took on positions in several high pressure laboratories around the world, including the University of Paris VI in France, the National Institute for Materials Science in Tokyo and Osaka University in Japan, the Geophysical Laboratory at the Carnegie Institution for Science in the United States, and Clarendon Laboratory at the University of Oxford in the United Kingdom.

In 2001, Eremets joined the Max Planck Institute for Chemistry in Mainz, Germany, as a staff member and leader of the research group "High-pressure chemistry and physics".

Eremets is working on high temperature superconductivity in metallic hydrogen and hydrogen-rich compounds. Additionally he is interested in polymeric nitrogen, the synthesis of novel high energy density materials, the stability of diamonds, extending the present high static pressure limits over 500 GPa and the synthesis of molecules at pressure and temperature conditions occurring in the Earth mantle.
 
The core facility of the Mikhail Eremets research is a special diamond anvil cell, which can generate extreme pressures between the two diamonds anvils. This has already led to records of static pressure of 440 GPa, which corresponds to 4.4 million atmospheres and exceeds the pressure inside the Earth (360 GPa). The device can be complemented by a laser heating system, a cryostat, magnets and X-ray sources.

In a Nature paper published in summer 2015 Eremets describes how hydrogen sulfide conducts electricity without resistance at minus 70 degrees Celsius and at a pressure of 1.5 million bar. Thus, the 66-year-old researcher established with his team a temperature record for the superconductivity. In their latest experiments, Eremets and his collaborators have found the superconducting temperature of lanthanum hydride to be 250 K, being closer to room temperature by additional 47 K.

Honors and awards
 2016: Honorary doctorate of the University of Leipzig, Germany
 2015: Ugo Fano Medal of the Rome International Center for Materials Science of Superstripes (RICMASS) 
 2015: Top Ten listing „People who mattered this year“ magazine „Nature“ 2015 and „Top Ten Breakthroughs of 2015“, magazine „Physics World“
 Nominated as Nature's 10 people who mattered in 2015
 Visiting professor, Chinese Academy of Sciences.  
 Visiting professor, University of Tokyo, Institute for Solid State Physics (ISSP), Japan. 
 Visiting Professor, Research Center for Extreme Materials, Osaka University, Japan. 
 European Research Council Advanced Grant “Exploring conductive and metallic hydrogen”

Memberships in Professional Societies
American Physical Society (APS)
American Association for the Advancement of Science (AAAS)
Sigma Xi the Scientific Research Society
American Geophysical Union
 Max Planck Graduate Centre Mainz (MPGC)

Publications
Eremets has more than 180 articles including nine patents and one book: Eremets, M.I., High pressures experimental methods. 1996, Oxford: Oxford University Press.

 Drozdov, A.P., et al., Superconductivity at 250 K in lanthanum hydride under high pressures. Nature 2019. 569: p. 528-531.  
 Drozdov, A.P., et al., Conventional superconductivity at 203 K at high pressures. Nature 2015. 525: p. 73-77. 
 Eremets, M.I. and I.A. Troyan, Conductive dense hydrogen. Nature Materials, 2011. 10: p. 927-931. 
 Eremets, M.I., et al., Single-bonded cubic form of nitrogen. Nature Materials, 2004. 3: p. 558-563. 
 Eremets, M.I., et al., Semiconducting non-molecular nitrogen up to 240 GPa and its low-pressure stability. Nature, 2001. 411: p. 170-174. 
 Ma, Y., et al., Transparent Dense Sodium. Nature, 2009. 458: p. 182-185. 
 Einaga, M., et al., Crystal Structure of 200 K-Superconducting Phase of Sulfur Hydride. Nature Physics, 2016. 
 Palasyuk, T., et al., Ammonia as a case study for the spontaneous ionization of a simple hydrogen-bonded compound. Nature Communications, 2014. 5: p. 3460. 
 Struzhkin, V.V., et al., Superconductivity in Dense Lithium. Science, 2002. 298: p. 1213-1215. 
 Eremets, M.I., et al., Superconductivity in boron. Science, 2001. 293: p. 272-274. 
 Shimizu, K., et al., Superconductivity in oxygen. Nature, 1998. 393: p. 767-769. 
 Eremets, M.I., et al., Metallic CsI at Pressures of up to 220 Gigapascals. Science, 1998. 281: p. 1333-1335. 
 Eremets, M.I., High pressures experimental methods. 1996, Oxford: Oxford University Press. 
 Medvedev, S., et al., Electronic and magnetic phase diagram of b-Fe1:01Se with superconductivity at 36.7 K under pressure. Nature Materials, 2009. 8: p. 630 - 633. 
 Eremets, M.I., et al., Superconductivity in Hydrogen Dominant Materials: Silane. Science 2008. 319: p. 1506-1509

References

1949 births
Living people
Belarusian scientists
Max Planck Society people
Soviet physicists